Wiese Island, or Vize Island ( Ostrov Vize), also known as Zemlya Vize is an isolated Russian island located in the Arctic Ocean, named after Russian oceanographer of German-descent Vladimir Wiese.

Geography
This island is desolate and subject to severe Arctic storms, but it has no glaciers. In the summer, large areas of the island are free of ice and snow. The closest land is Ushakov Island  further north.

Wiese Island lies at the northern end of the Kara Sea, roughly midway between Franz Josef Land and Severnaya Zemlya. It belongs to the Taymyrsky Dolgano-Nenetsky District of the Krasnoyarsk Krai administrative division of Russia. Owing to its extreme northerly location, the surrounding sea is covered with pack ice in the winter, and it is quite full of ice floes even in the summer.

The island's coastline is also receding at a very fast rate, due to erosion.

History
In 1924, oceanographer Vladimir Wiese studied the drift of Georgy Brusilov's ill-fated Russian ship Svyataya Anna when she was trapped on the pack ice of the Kara Sea. Wiese detected an odd deviation of the path of the ship's drift caused by certain variations of the patterns of sea and ice currents. He deemed that the deviation was caused by the presence of an undiscovered island whose coordinates he was able to calculate with precision thanks to the availability of the successive positions of the St. Anna during its drift. The data of the drift had been supplied by navigator Valerian Albanov, one of the only two survivors of the St. Anna.

Finally, the island was discovered on 13 August 1930 by a Soviet expedition led by Otto Schmidt aboard the Icebreaker Sedov under Captain Vladimir Voronin. The island was named after Professor Wiese of the Soviet Arctic Institute who was at the time aboard the Sedov and who was able to set foot on the island whose existence he had predicted.

The first wintering in Wiese Island took place in 1945–46. A hydrometeorological polar station was established on 1 November 1945. Wiese Island's polar station is one of the northernmost in the world.

Climate
Wiese island has an extreme Arctic climate, with temperatures only able to struggle above freezing slightly for a couple of months a year and temperatures are regularly below −20 °C from November all the way through to the following April.

See also
 List of islands of Russia
 List of research stations in the Arctic

References

Select bibliography
 Summary of the Arctic archipelagos and islands. Scott Polar Research Institute, University of Cambridge.

External links
 Arctic Postal History - Picture of a radiogram from airplane H425 to the polar base at Vize Island

Islands of the Kara Sea
Populated places of Arctic Russia
Islands of Krasnoyarsk Krai
Arctic research